First Testament may refer to:

 Old Testament, in the Bible
 The First Testament, an unreleased Sunz of Man album